Eusébio de Matos e Guerra (Salvador, 1629 - 7 July 1692) was an orator, painter, poet, and professor of theology. He worked between 1629 and 1692 and was a student of Maurício de Nassau, founder of the "Bahian school" of painting. He was a brother of the satirist Gregório de Matos (1636-1696).

Early life and education

Eusébio de Matos was born in Salvador, Bahia in 1629, the son of nobleman Pedro Gonçalves de Mattos and Dona Marina da Guerra. Eusébio and his brother Gregório studied humanities together under Father António Vieira, a philosopher. He joined the Society of Jesus on March 14, 1644 at the age of 15, became an instructor, and ultimately succeeded Antonio Vieira. He became one of three noted orators in Salvador, along with António Vieira and Father Antônio de Sá. He was also a musician and composer. He was played the viola and harp, and composed both sacred and secular music.

Later career

He represented the interests of his family in transaction with the colleges of the Jesuits of Bahia and Santo Antão de Lisboa in 1659. He was called to Lisbon in 1669 to serve as orator of the King of Portugal, but was prevented from going by his superiors. He published Ecce Homo in Lisbon in 1677. He left the Society of Jesus and joined the Order of Mount Carmel in 1680, and became known as Eusébio da Soledade. He published the Sermão da soledade e lágrimas de Maria Santíssima Senhora Nossa in Lisbon in 1681. He returned to Bahia in the same year.  He died on July 7, 1692. A collection of his sermons were published In 1694, after his death in Lisbon in 1694. Ecce Homo was published in Rio de Janeiro in 1923.

Paintings

The painting on the ceiling of the nave of Church and Convent of Our Lady of Carmo, completed in the middle of the 17th century, is attributed to him. Eusébio da Soledade is also the author of the painting of São Pedro Arrependido, which was located in the Church and Monastery of Our Lady of Monserrate until the end of the 1940s.

Works

Ecce Homo
Sermão da Soledade e Lagrimas de Maria Santissima pregado na Sé da Bahia
Sermões do padre Mestre Eusebio de Mattos
Oração fúnebre nas exéquias de D. Estevam Dos Santos, Bispo do Brasil, 14 de julho de 1672
Seis sermões do Rosário (lost)

References

1629 births
1692 deaths
17th-century Brazilian people
Brazilian people of Portuguese descent
People from Salvador, Bahia
Portuguese-language writers